Venturer Scouts, formerly Senior Scouts, and commonly known simply as Venturers, is the fourth section of Scouts Australia, and was first formed in 1946. Venturers are aged between 14.5 and 18 years of age and are organised into Units, which can be a part of a single Scout Group or a stand-alone group. Both types of Unit take Scouts from any Scout Group. Although not in common usage, the motto of the Venturer Scout section in Australia is "Look Wide".

The highest award in Venturers is the Queen's Scout. This award recognises people who can set their own challenging goals and achieve them. This section of Scouts Australia is about Venturers organising and running their own activities with leader support, moving away from a reliance on adult leaders.

Structure

A Venturer Unit is run by its Unit Council, usually consisting of a Unit Chair, Secretary, Treasurer and some General Members. Some larger units also include an Assistant Unit Chair, Social Secretary, Fund-raising Coordinator, Quartermaster or assistant secretaries and treasurers.

While the younger sections are represented by their leaders at the district level, Venturers are encouraged to attend their monthly District Venturer Council. In Australia, all scouting is divided by state into Branches, and then into smaller, geographically defined, districts. The District Venturer Scout Council (DVSC) is a monthly meeting of the Venturer Scouts and Leaders in the District which serves both as a check on the quality of the potential Queen's Scouts in the District and for sharing information between the Units in the area. It is also a social meeting for both the Leaders and Venturers to catch up with each other. Where the district, for whatever reason, is not appropriate for these meetings, typically due to low numbers in the District, a Zone (ZVSC) is formed as a replacement for the district.

Branch level activities are becoming more and more popular because of the difficulty in running unit level activities. Unit management is a problem for many units because of small number of attendances and difficulty in running successful activities for small groups, as well as motivation. Most Branches have a themed competitive hike run at Easter, plus many smaller activities, normally put on by dedicated leaders. These often are courses required for badge work as well.

Lones Venturer Unit
There is also a unit of Venturers in each state for those people that are unable to attend, or unable to find a Venturer Unit close to them. This is called the Lones section, they do all badge work by correspondence and are still able to go to all the "Ventures", camps and hikes, just like a normal Venturer.

Sea Scouts
There is a small percentage of groups that are known as Sea Scouts. These groups still practice the same way as regular scouting groups, but often have a higher focus on water activities. The first such group to identify as Sea Scouts, and regarded as being the first Scout group in Australia are the 1st Victorian Sea Scout Group which was founded in Albert Park, Victoria with a history dating back to 1912. The 1st Victorian Sea Scout Group is currently still active and hosts a Cub pack, Scout Troop and Venturer Unit in the Albert Park Reserve, located in the suburb of South Melbourne, in the boundaries of City of Port Phillip

Badge Work 

The highest award is the Queen's Scout. Queen's Scout is about members extending their commitment and achievement in a variety of areas, to strive for better than they do already. One of the key points is that the levels are peer reviewed, so larger parts of the award have to be approved by the District Venturer Council while most can be approved by the Unit Council. The award is split into four activity areas which are then split again as follows:

Leadership Development
Leadership
Unit Management
Vocations
Adventurous Activities
Outdoor
Expeditions
Initiative
Elective of either Outdoor 2 or Expeditions 2
Personal Growth
Pursuits
Ideals
Lifestyles
Expression
Elective of a second level of any of these
Community Involvement
Service
First Aid
Citizenship
Environment
Elective of either Environment 2 or Service 2

Each subsection earns a stripe and upon completion of all level 1 badges, and a level 2 badge from each section, the Venturer will qualify for the Queen's Scout. This would go on the uniform of the Venturer. The Queen Scout can be coupled with The Duke of Edinburgh's Award.

Other badges include the Venturing Skills award, a basic outdoor skills earned during introduction to the unit; the Endeavour Award; and the Venturer Award, a halfway point to Queen Scout, achieved when the Venturer has completed five compulsory level 1 badges (Unit Management, Initiative, Ideals, Environment and First Aid), plus an additional two level 1 badges.

Australian Venture

Venturers also have the opportunity to participate in a "Venture", the Venturing equivalent of a Jamboree. Ventures differ from Jamborees in the greater freedom and latitude Venturers experience there, in line with the greater freedoms associated with being in the Venturer section. There are a number of on-site activities, as well as an off site expedition, normally totalling about 12 days long. The most recent Australian Venture was held in Brisbane from 2–13 January 2018.

Activities
Some of the included activities provided by Venturers include:
Rock Climbing
Abseiling
Flying
Canoeing
Canyoning
4WD
Camps (Including the largest camp, 'Venture')
Bushwalks (Including the largest bushwalk, 'Dragon Skin', for Venturers in New South Wales)

See also
 Australian Venture
 Venturer Scout
 Venturer Sea Scouts
 Venturing (Boy Scouts of America)

References

External links
Venturers South Australia Branch
Venturers Victoria
Australian Queen Scout Association
Scouts Australia
Venturer Sea Scouts

Scouting and Guiding in Australia